The 1973 Virginia Slims of Chicago  was a women's tennis tournament played on indoor carpet courts at the Lake Shore Racquet Club in Chicago, Illinois in the United States that was part of the 1973 Virginia Slims World Championship Series. It was the second edition of the tournament and was held from March 8 through March 11, 1973. First-seeded Margaret Court won the singles title and earned $6,500 first-prize money.

Finals

Singles
 Margaret Court defeated  Billie Jean King 6–2, 4–6, 6–4

Doubles
 Rosie Casals /  Billie Jean King defeated  Karen Krantzcke /  Betty Stöve 6–4, 6–2

Prize money

References

External links
 Women's Tennis Association (WTA) tournament details

Virginia Slims of Chicago
1973 in Illinois
Carpet court tennis tournaments
March 1973 sports events in the United States